State Highway 15 in the U.S. state of Colorado is a north–south, then east–west, state highway in the San Luis Valley region of Southern Colorado. It connects the two towns of Monte Vista and La Jara. There is a gap in the route.

Route description

SH 15 begins at a concurrency between US 285 and US 160. After the gap, SH 15 reappears in Centro and heads east to pass through Capulin, cross over the La Jara Creek, and end at US 285, north of La Jara.

History
The route was established in the 1920s as a much longer route, but it was gradually cut down to its current length. The route was paved in 1957.

Major intersections

See also

 List of state highways in Colorado

References

External links

Transportation in Rio Grande County, Colorado
Transportation in Conejos County, Colorado
015